Anukreethy Vas (born 1998/1999) is an Indian model and beauty pageant titleholder who was crowned Femina Miss India 2018. She represented India at the 68th edition of Miss World pageant held in Sanya, China on 8 December 2018 where she ended up placing in the Top 30.

Personal life 
Anukreethy was born and brought up in Tiruchirappalli, Tamil Nadu, India. She was abandoned by her father at age seven and was raised by her mother Seleena. 

She attended the Montfort School, Tiruchirappalli. She completed her senior secondary education from R. S. Krishnan Higher Secondary School. She is currently pursuing her BA degree in French Literature at Loyola College, Chennai. She also has a younger brother who is currently studying in college 

She is a sports person and motorbike enthusiast.

She married to her long-term boyfriend.

Pageant history

Anukreethy Vas was crowned Femina Miss India 2018 by the outgoing titleholder and Miss World 2017 Manushi Chhillar. Previously, she was crowned as Femina Miss India Tamil Nadu 2018 in February 2018. During the competition, she was crowned Miss Beautiful Smile and won the Beauty with a Purpose award. Anukreethy represented India at the Miss World 2018 pageant held in Sanya, China on 8 December 2018, where she made it to the top 18 of the Talent round. She also entered the top 30 of the competition by winning the head-to-head challenge of her round.

Filmography

Films

References

External links

 

Femina Miss India winners
Indian beauty pageant winners
Living people
Miss World 2018 delegates
Female models from Tamil Nadu
Artists from Tiruchirappalli
Year of birth missing (living people)